Jean-Marie is both a given name and a surname. Notable people with the name include:

 Jean-Marie Abgrall (born 1950), a French psychiatrist, criminologist, specialist in forensic medicine, cult expert, and graduate in criminal law
 Jean-Marie Charles Abrial (1879–1962), a French Admiral and Minister of Marine of France
 Jean-Marie Andre (born 1944), a Belgian scientist
 Jean-Marie Auberson (1920–2004), a Swiss conductor and violinist
 Jean-Marie Balestre (born 1921), a president of FISA
 Jean-Marie Basset (born 1943), a French chemist
 Jean-Marie Beaupuy (born 1943), a French politician
 Jean-Marie Benjamin, a priest
 Jean-Marie Beurel (1813–1872), a French Roman Catholic priest
 Jean-Marie Bockel (born 1950), a French politician
 Jean-Marie Buchet, a Belgian film director
 Jean-Marie Cavada (born 1940), a French politician
 Jean-Marie Charpentier (20th century), a French architect and urban planner
 Jean-Marie Chopin (19th century), a Russian explorer of the Caucasus
 Jean-Marie Collot d'Herbois (1749–1796), a French actor, dramatist, essayist and revolutionary
 Jean-Marie Colombani (born 1948), a French journalist
 Jean-Marie De Koninck (born 1949), a French-Canadian mathematician
 Jean-Marie de Lamennais (1780–1860), a French Roman Catholic priest
 Jean-Marie Dedecker (born 1952), a Belgian-Flemish politician
 Jean-Marie Delwart, a Belgian businessman
 Jean-Marie Domenach (1922–1997), a French writer and intellectual
 Jean-Marie Ducharme (1723–1807), a fur trader and political figure
 Jean-Marie Claude Alexandre Goujon (1766–1795), a French journalist, lawyer, and statesman
 Jean-Marie Guéhenno (born 1949), a French diplomat
 Jean-Marie Guyau (1854–1888), a French philosopher and poet
 Jean-Marie Halsdorf (born 1957), a Luxembourgian politician
 Jean-Marie Le Bris (1817–1872), a French aviator
 Jean-Marie Gustave Le Clézio (born 1940), a French author
 Jean-Marie Le Pen (born 1928), a French far-right politician
 Jean-Marie Leblanc (born 1944), a French retired professional road bicycle racer
 Jean-Marie Leclair (1697–1764), a Baroque violinist and composer
 Jean-Marie Leclair the younger (1703–1777), French composer
 Jean-Marie Lehn (born 1939), a French chemist
 Jean-Marie Londeix (born 1932), a French saxophonist
 Jean-Marie Loret (1919-1985), a French railway worker, claimed to be the son of Adolf Hitler
 Jean-Marie Lustiger (1926–2007), a French cardinal of the Roman Catholic Church
 Jean-Marie Atangana Mebara, a Cameroonian politician
 Jean-Marie Messier (born 1956), a French businessman
 Jean-Marie Mokole, a member of the Pan-African Parliament
 Jean-Marie Mondelet (circa 1771–1843), a notary and political figure in Lower Canada
 Jean-Marie Morel (1728–1810), a French architect
 Jean-Marie Musy (1876–1952), a Swiss politician
 Jean-Marie Neff (born 1961), a French racewalker
 Jean-Marie Pallardy (born 1940), a French film director
 Jean-Marie Pelt (born 1933), a French botanist
 Jean-Marie Peretti, a French researcher and teacher in human resources management
 Jean-Marie Perrot (1877–1943), a Breton priest
 Jean-Marie Pfaff (born 1953), a Belgian former football goalkeeper
 Jean-Marie Poiré (born 1945), a French film director, writer and producer
 Jean-Marie Poitras (born 1918), a former Canadian senator
 Jean-Marie Raoul (1766–1837), a French lawyer and musician 
 Jean-Marie Riachi (born 1970), a Lebanese arranger, composer and record producer
 Jean-Marie Roland, vicomte de la Platière (1734–1793), a French statesman
 Jean-Marie Rouart (born 1943), a French novelist, essayist and journalist
 Jean-Marie Souriau, a mathematician
 Jean-Marie Straub (born 1933), a French filmmaker
 Jean-Marie Tjibaou (1936–1989), an Oceanian politician
 Jean-Marie Toulouse (born 1942), a Canadian academic
 Jean-Marie Trappeniers (born 1942), a Belgian football goalkeeper
 Jean-Marie Villot (1905–1979), a French cardinal of the Roman Catholic Church

People with the surname
 Lincoln Jean-Marie (born 1966), a British singer

See also 
 Jean Marie
 Jean-Marie-Rodrigue
 Louis-Jean-Marie

Compound given names
French masculine given names